is an English unjust enrichment case, concerning the meaning of enrichment.

Facts
Wigan Athletic AFC was required to pay for additional policing at its grounds. Without this, they could not hold matches except in breach of the safety certificate issued under the Safety of Sports Grounds Act 1975. It claimed this was unlawful.

Judgment
The Court of Appeal (by a majority) held that it was not unjust for the football club to refuse to pay for policing at the additional level stipulated by the Chief Constable.

See also

English unjust enrichment law

References

English unjust enrichment case law
Court of Appeal (England and Wales) cases
2008 in case law
2008 in British law